Beaches is a 2017 American drama television film directed by Allison Anders from a screenplay by Nikole Beckwith and Kate Lanier. It is a remake of the 1988 film of the same name. The film stars Idina Menzel and Nia Long. The film premiered on Lifetime on January 21, 2017.

Premise
Two friends, with different backgrounds, maintain a long-lasting friendship through childhood, love, and tragedy.

Cast
 Idina Menzel as CC Bloom
 Gabriella Pizzolo as young CC Bloom
 Nia Long as Hillary Whitney
 Grace Capeless as young Hillary Whitney
 Antonio Cupo as John Pierce
 Barbara Beall as costume designer
 Daniel Letto as Sorcerer actor
 Colin Lawrence as Bryan
 Sanai Victoria as Tory Whitney
 Rebecca Husain as Pretty Sinners director
 Graeme Duffy as Sorcerer composer
 Kate Isaac as assistant district attorney
 Jane Hancock as Ashley

Production
On July 28, 2016, the film was announced, with Idina Menzel joining the cast. On August 16, 2016, it was announced Nia Long had joined the cast. Principal photography began on August 15, 2016.

Reception
Beaches received negative reviews, with most critics assessing it as inferior to the already mediocre 1988 original. Mike Hale of The New York Times pointed out the absurdity of remaking Beaches, itself a 1950s throwback which failed to update its themes to the decades in which the film is set. He added, "Stuffing the story into 70 percent of the time makes C. C. and Hillary's cycle of fights and reconciliations feel more arbitrary than ever, especially in the absence of [Bette] Midler, whose vivid portrayal of C. C. provided motivations that weren't in the script." Blake Meredith of the Los Angeles Times wrote, "Any time a beloved movie or TV series gets a remake, knee-jerk purists howl about it 'ruining' the original. 'Beaches' [...] is the rare case of a remake that might actually do just that." She explained that by reducing the length to 90 minutes while otherwise staying faithful to the original film only serves to make the silliness of the original Beaches stand out more clearly, particularly noting how the shorter length forces most of the plot to be delivered through exposition. CNN Entertainment described it as tedious and dated, but said Menzel's singing is a highlight and makes the film arguably worth watching by Lifetime standards. The Boston Globe said it echoed the chief shortcoming of the original film, the lack of substantial basis for C.C. and Hillary's friendship. Reviewer Matthew Gilbert stated, "It's not so much that Menzel and Long are bad – they're consistently OK, if never better than that — but the story is too hollow for them to dig in. Singer-actress CC and lawyer Hillary meet as kids, become pen pals, room together, fall in love with the same guy ... and go through their expected friendship arc. None of it manages to work up much lather."

References

External links
 
 

2017 drama films
2017 films
2017 television films
2010s American films
2010s buddy drama films
2010s English-language films
2010s female buddy films
American buddy drama films
American drama television films
American female buddy films
Films based on American novels
Films directed by Allison Anders
Films scored by Lesley Barber
Films set on beaches
Films shot in Vancouver
Lifetime (TV network) films
Remakes of American films
Television remakes of films